Jack Raharuhi Hemi (23 August 1914 – 1 June 1996) was a New Zealand rugby union and league player. He was born in Te Poho-o-Tutawake, Wairarapa, New Zealand on 23 August 1914.

Early years
Jack Hemi was the oldest son of Hineipikitia-ki-te-rangi (Piki) Reiri, of Te Whiti, and her husband, Paraikete (Blanket) Hēmi. There were thirteen children in the family. Hemi attended Te Whiti School. He worked at a freezing works and, when his father died in 1936, Hemi assumed responsibility for his mother and four siblings. Of Māori descent, he identified with the Ngati Kahungunu and Rangitane iwi.

Rugby union career
Hemi played rugby union for the Gladstone club before moving to the Featherston club and first represented Wairarapa in 1933, aged only 18. He played for New Zealand Māori in 1934 and toured Australia with the team in 1935. He was also an All Blacks trialist in 1935.

Rugby league career
In 1936 Hemi switched codes, joining the new Manukau rugby league club in the Auckland Rugby League competition. He represented New Zealand that year against Great Britain and also played for Auckland. He represented New Zealand Māori in 1937, being part of the team that defeated Australia 16–5 at Carlaw Park.

He toured Australia in 1938, slotting a goal against Queensland from 17 yards behind the halfway line. Hemi toured Great Britain in 1939, but World War II ended the tour without a test match being played. Exempt from War duty Hemi continued to play for Manukau. In 1941 he scored 206 points for Manukau in all competition matches which was comfortably a record in Auckland Rugby League senior football to that point. He scored 12 tries, and kicked 59 conversions along with 26 penalties during the season.

In 1945 he represented Wellington alongside his younger brother, Lou.

References

1914 births
1996 deaths
20th-century New Zealand people
Auckland rugby league team players
Manukau Magpies players
Māori All Blacks players
New Zealand Māori rugby league players
New Zealand Māori rugby league team players
New Zealand national rugby league team players
New Zealand rugby league players
New Zealand rugby union players
New Zealand trade unionists
Ngāti Kahungunu people
People from Carterton, New Zealand
Rugby league fullbacks
Rugby league players from Wellington Region
Rugby union fullbacks
Rugby union centres
Rugby union players from the Wellington Region
Rangitāne people
Wellington rugby league team players